Dinora Lizeth Garza Rodríguez (born 24 January 1988) is a Mexican footballer who plays as a striker for Liga MX Femenil UNAM and the Mexico women's national team.

Playing career

Club

Chicago Red Stars
In January 2013, Garza was included in a list of 55 players from the U.S., Canada, and Mexico national teams that were allocated to the eight teams in the new National Women's Soccer League. She was allocated to the Chicago Red Stars. In 2014, Garza was reallocated to the Boston Breakers but declined to participate in the league any further.

International

References

External links
 
 Dinora Garza at Chicago Red Stars
 

1988 births
Living people
Mexican women's footballers
Footballers from Tamaulipas
People from Reynosa
Women's association football midfielders
Women's association football forwards
Mexico women's international footballers
2011 FIFA Women's World Cup players
Pan American Games bronze medalists for Mexico
Pan American Games medalists in football
Footballers at the 2011 Pan American Games
National Women's Soccer League players
Chicago Red Stars players
Liga MX Femenil players
C.F. Monterrey (women) players
Mexican expatriate women's footballers
Mexican expatriate sportspeople in the United States
Expatriate women's soccer players in the United States
Medalists at the 2011 Pan American Games
20th-century Mexican women
21st-century Mexican women
Mexican footballers